Jean Auguste Frédéric Bourguet (7 February 1889 – 20 April 1978) was a French industrialist and politician who led the French Resistance in the Tarn department during World War II.

Biography 
He graduated from the University of Montpellier as Doctor of Law and practiced as a lawyer for a few years.

In 1912, he took over the textile factory of his family-in-law in Labastide-Rouairoux. "Imbued with social convictions", he offered free housing to his workers and implemented an inflation-based salary scale in order to protect his employees' purchasing power. He employed up to 300 people at once in the factory.

Right after World War I, he became mayor of Labastide-Rouairoux and was reelected until 1947. Between 1925 and 1976, he was also elected conseiller général of the Tarn department.

During World War II, when Southern France was annexed by Nazi Germany, Bourguet got involved into the Resistance, and soon became its leader in the Tarn. In 1944, he was nominated by Free France as president of the Comité départemental de libération.

In 1974, he became senator and held office until 1977.

Honours 
  Officier of the Legion of Honour (1953)
  1914–1918 War Cross
  Resistance Medal (1945)
  Chevalier of the Academic Palms
  Commandeur of the Order of Commercial Merit
  Médaille d'honneur départementale et communale, gold (1958)

References 

French Senators of the Fifth Republic
Recipients of the Croix de Guerre 1914–1918 (France)
1889 births
1978 deaths
French industrialists
French Resistance members
Senators of Tarn (department)
Officiers of the Légion d'honneur
Recipients of the Resistance Medal
Chevaliers of the Ordre des Palmes Académiques
Mayors of places in Occitania (administrative region)
University of Montpellier alumni
20th-century French lawyers
20th-century French businesspeople
Businesspeople in textiles